Autumn's Grey Solace is an American ethereal wave and dream pop duo from St. Augustine, Florida, United States.  It consists of soprano vocalist and keyboardist Erin Welton and guitarist Scott Ferrell. They have released a total of fifteen albums (including 14 original albums and 1 best-of compilation) since 2002.

History
The band began recording their first album, Within the Depths of a Darkened Forest, in 2000, and was released in 2002.  Afterwards they continued to record and write new songs, and were signed to Projekt Records in 2004.  Later that year they released their second album, Over the Ocean on Projekt Records.  In 2005 they released their third album, Riverine and in 2006 released their fourth, Shades of Grey.  On May 6, 2008, their fifth album, Ablaze was released.  This album received very positive reviews and was advertised on the front page of Projekt Records' website.

Their sixth studio album, Eifelian was released on February 8, 2011. Their seventh studio album, Divinian was released on October 2, 2012. Their eighth studio album, Monajjfyllen was released on December 13, 2014. Their ninth studio album, Windumæra was released on June 11, 2016, with high resolution downloads available at their bandcamp page. Their tenth studio album, Celestial Realms was released on July 1, 2017. Their eleventh studio album, Eocene was released on September 22, 2018. Their twelfth studio album, Englelícra was released on November 1, 2019.

Compilations
Autumn's Grey Solace contributed to Projekt Records' "Projekt Holiday Single No. 1" in 2004 with the song "Through The Snowy Trees".  They also covered the song "Musica Eternal" by Dead Can Dance for the tribute album Summoning of the Muse - A Tribute to Dead Can Dance in 2005.

Winterrim is a selection of songs taken from their albums Over the Ocean through Eifelian, which was released on October 1, 2012.

Discography
 Within the Depths of a Darkened Forest (2002)
 Over the Ocean (2004)
 Riverine (2005)
 Shades of Grey (2006)
 Ablaze (2008)
 Eifelian (2011)
 Winterrim (2012)
 Divinian (2012)
 Monajjfyllen (2014)
 Windumæra (2016)
 Celestial Realms (2017)
 Eocene (2018)
 Englelícra (2019)
 XIII (2021)
 Therium (2022)

References

External links
 Scott Ferrell interviewed at OceanViewPress

American shoegaze musical groups
Projekt Records artists
American gothic rock groups